The Coweeman River is a tributary of the Cowlitz River, in the South West corner of the U.S. state of Washington. Its name comes from the Cowlitz word ko-wee-na, meaning "short one", referring to a short Indian who once lived along the river.

Course
Just below the mouth of its first named tributary, Butler Creek, the river drops over Washboard Falls.

See also
List of rivers of Washington
Tributaries of the Columbia River

References

Rivers of Cowlitz County, Washington
Rivers of Washington (state)